The Macau national security law is a law in Macau which prohibits and punishes acts of "treason, secession, and subversion" against the Central government, as well as "preparatory acts" leading to any of the three acts.  Taken into effect on 3 March 2009, the purpose of the law is to fulfil Article 23 of the Macau Basic Law, the de facto constitution of the Macau Special Administration Region.
Macau National Security Law has been in force for eleven years, and the National Security Law has not been used.

History
According to the Secretary for Administration and Justice Florinda da Rosa Silva Chan, drafting began in 2004, taking into account examples from Portugal and Italy.  Until 1999, Macau was a colony of Portugal.  The draft was released on 22 October 2008. It proposed to ban treason, attempts to overthrow the Chinese government and theft of national secrets.  Some of the proposed offenses carry a maximum penalty of 25 years in jail.

Response to drafting of the law
Edmund Ho, Chief Executive of Macau, said in a press conference that the bill targets "serious criminal behavior" and will not limit protests or criticism of Beijing.  He further said "Chanting a few slogans, writing a few articles criticizing the central government or the Macau government, these activities won't be regulated by this proposed law."  Macau Legislator Au Kam-san said "We don't want to see any mainland style national security law.  It would be acceptable to enact a law based on the Johannesburg Principles.

Political commentator Larry So Man-yum said the legislation would do well in Macau given residents' patriotism and their lack of awareness about civil rights. "There will be absolutely no problem. Compared to Hongkongers, Macau people have high levels of acceptance for the central government.  No "Broomhead" will emerge in Macau." In 2003, Secretary for Security Regina Ip was nicknamed "Broomhead" for attempting to sell Article 23 in Hong Kong.  The Hong Kong government on 22 October responded with having no plan to embark on the legislation, adding its most pressing commitments are economic and livelihood issues.

See also
 One country, two systems
 Human rights in the People's Republic of China
 Human rights in Macau
 Human rights in Hong Kong
 Hong Kong Macau cultural exchange
 Hong Kong national security law

References

Bibliography

 . Includes English translation of most of the draft law.

External links
 Macau Special Administrative Region National Security Law (Chinese and English Text) – Chinese version and unofficial English translation by Amnesty International hosted on the website of the Congressional-Executive Commission on China of the United States. 
 第 2/2009 號法律《維護國家安全法》/Lei n.º 2/2009 – Lei relativa à defesa da segurança do Estado –  Official Chinese and Portuguese texts of the law published on pages 519–525 of Official Gazette No. 9/2009 of 2 March 2009
 HTML of the Chinese version hosted on the website of the Government Printing Bureau
 HTML of the Portuguese version hosted on the website of the Government Printing Bureau

Basic Law of Macau
Politics of Macau
2008 in Macau